Garvagh High School was a secondary school located in Garvagh, County Londonderry, Northern Ireland. It was a non-selective state maintained school for girls and boys aged from 11 to 16. It had 198 pupils and is within the North Eastern Education and Library Board area.

On 1 October 2012, Education Minister John O’Dowd approved a development proposal to close Garvagh High School. This decision comes in light of a decline in enrollment in recent years.

The school closed on 31 August 2013.

In January 2016 it was rumored that Danny Glover, the American actor and film director was considering turning the disused building into an acting school.

References

Secondary schools in County Londonderry